Iremonger is an English surname, relating to an ironmonger, that may refer to:
 Albert Iremonger (1884–1958), brother of James, county-class cricketer and goalkeeper for Nottinghamshire
 Edmund Iremonger, British politician
 Harold Iremonger (1882–1937), Royal Marine officer and acting Governor of Saint Helena
 James Iremonger (1876–1956), Nottinghamshire cricketer and England soccer international
 Thomas Iremonger (1916–1998), British Conservative Party politician
 Valentin Iremonger (1918–1991), Irish diplomat and poet
 William Iremonger (1776–1852), nineteenth-century English colonel who erected Dead Man's Plack
  Very Rev Frederic Iremonger, DD (1878–1952), eminent Anglican priest 

English-language surnames
Occupational surnames